KFFS-CD (channel 36) is a low-power, Class A television station in Fayetteville, Arkansas, United States, affiliated with the digital multicast network Court TV. It is owned by Pinnacle Media alongside Estrella TV affiliate KFDF-CD (channel 44). The two stations share studios on North College Avenue in Fayetteville; KFFS-CD's transmitter is located on South 56th Street in Springdale.

KQRY-LD (channel 36) in Fort Smith is a translator of KFFS-CD; this station's transmitter is located near Winslow, Arkansas.

KQRY-LD history

At one point, KQRY-LP (as Univision affiliate KXUN-LP) aired local newscasts; they were produced out of Little Rock, Arkansas, with reports produced in Fort Smith. The newscasts were canceled in June 2008, after then-owner Equity Media Holdings instituted a companywide suspension of news programs.

After failing to find a buyer at a bankruptcy auction, KXUN was sold to Pinnacle Media in August 2009 (after having initially been included in Silver Point Finance's acquisition on June 2 of several Equity stations), with Pinnacle assuming control under a local marketing agreement on August 5.

KXUN was previously seen on KPBI's digital subchannel 34.2; after KPBI was sold to Local TV LLC and renamed KXNW, the KXUN simulcast was replaced with a simulcast of new sister station KFSM-TV. On February 5, 2019, KXUN-LD swapped call signs with KQRY-LD in Sallisaw, Oklahoma.

Subchannels
The station's digital signal is multiplexed:

References

External links
 

Television channels and stations established in 1995
FFS-CD
Court TV affiliates
Equity Media Holdings
Low-power television stations in the United States